Igtip Kangertiva, also known as Comanche Bay. is a fjord in Eastern Greenland. It is part of the Sermersooq municipality.

History

During World War II a weather station of the US Army Air Corps and the US Coast Guard was established in Comanche Bay. The decision was taken in the spring of 1942 and the USCGC Comanche (WPG-76), a ship of the Greenland Patrol, was sent to survey the fjord. The USCGC Comanche reached the site in July and the bay was subsequently named after it.
 
Besides the weather facility the US military wanted a base from which the warplanes of Operation Bolero that were forced to land on the Greenland ice sheet could be rescued. Owing to its closeness to the inland ice Comanche Bay was deemed a favorable place from which to send rescue patrols. However, when shortly thereafter a Boeing B-17 Flying Fortress crash-landed on the ice sheet not far from Comanche Bay, a rescue operation ran into difficulties because of treacherous crevasses near the crash site and two men were lost. Following this accident the base was closed in the fall of the same year.
  
On account of war-related priorities the Comanche Bay base was reestablished in 1943 by Major John T. Crowell, along with a facility at Cape Cort Adelaer further south down the coast. The coastal stations were abandoned at the end of the war.

Geography
Igtip Kangertiva or Comanche Bay lies at the southwestern limit of King Christian IX Land, a few miles east of Pikiulleq. Its mouth lies between Ole Romer Island to the west and Aqitseq to the east. The fjord is oriented in a roughly NNW/SSE direction. There are a number of low islets in its western shore close to its mouth.

Bibliography 
 Wallace R. Hansen. Greenland's Icy Fury. Williams-Ford Texas A&M University Military History Series. 1994 .

See also
List of fjords of Greenland
My Gal Sal (aircraft)

References

External links
The lost squadron and Comanche Bay
The NYT - Search Crew Finds World War II Plane That Crashed in Greenland
War History - A plane found 38 feet under the ice: A Daring, High-Risk Rescue
‘Frozen in Time’: The fate of brave airmen, locked in the ice
Fjords of Greenland
World War II sites in Greenland